The 2016 A Lyga, also known as SMSCredit.lt A Lyga for sponsoring purposes was the 27th season of the A Lyga, the top-tier association football league of Lithuania. The season began on 2 March and ended on 26 November 2016. Žalgiris Vilnius were the defending champions.

Teams 

FK Šiauliai failed to obtain a license to play in the A Lyga and were relegated alongside FK Kruoja, which withdrew and FK Klaipedos Granitas, which was disqualified. They were replaced by FK Lietava Jonava, which will make its debut at the top level. FK Spyris Kaunas changed its name to FK Kauno Žalgiris.

Changes from 2015 

The league reduced its number of teams from ten sides down to eight. As a consequence, each team will play every other four times, twice at home and twice away with the top six then playing an additional round against each other.

Clubs and locations 

The following teams are competing in the 2016 championship:

 Stadium location

Personnel and kits 
Note: Flags indicate national team as has been defined under FIFA eligibility rules. Players and Managers may hold more than one non-FIFA nationality.

Regular season

Table

Results

Championship round 
Top six will play each other once.

Table

Results

Relegation play-offs 
The 7th placed team will face the runners-up of the 2016 LFF I Lyga for a two-legged play-off. The winner on aggregate score after both matches will earn entry into the 2017 A Lyga.

First leg

Second leg 

3–3 on aggregate. Utenis won on away goals.

Season statistics

Top scorers

Hat-tricks

Attendance 

 — Official attendance statistic for the play-off matches wasn't publicly released.

Awards

Yearly awards 
Awards were presented at the LFF Awards ceremony, which was held on November 28. Finalists for voted awards were announced after the season and winners were presented at the award ceremony.

Quarterly awards

"Golden Heart" initiative 
From 2016 season A lyga together with Lithuanian Football Federation decided to expand project "Bring you hearts to the stadium" and honor players who played 10 or more times for the Lithuania national team with golden heart on their shirts.

In 2016 season these players have had this evaluation:
FK Žalgiris  — Egidijus Vaitkūnas, Saulius Mikoliūnas, Linas Pilibaitis, Marius Žaliūkas, Vytautas Lukša, Mantas Kuklys, Simonas Stankevičius
FK Trakai  — Deividas Česnauskis, Arūnas Klimavičius, Tadas Labukas, Nerijus Valskis
FK Kauno Žalgiris  — Andrius Velička, Ignas Dedura, Audrius Kšanavičius
FK Sūduva  — Tomas Radzinevičius, Vaidas Slavickas,
FK Atlantas  — Andrius Jokšas
FK Lietava  — Valdemaras Borovskis
FK Utenis  — Pavelas Leusas

Team of the Week

References 
 — The match between FK Žalgiris and FK Sūduva Marijampolė was postponed due to the Champions League qualification match happening that week, so neither club's players were considered for the award.

LFF Lyga seasons
1
Lithuania
Lithuania